Regalecus is a fish genus of the family Regalecidae, commonly called oarfish, with these currently recognized species:
 Regalecus glesne (P. Ascanius, 1772), giant oarfish or king of herrings
 Regalecus russelii (G. Cuvier, 1816)

References

External links

Regalecidae